B. C. Ramchandra Sharma (28 November 1925 – 18 April 2005) was an Indian playwright, translator and writer in Kannada language.

Works 
 Yelusuthina Kote (1953)
 Bhuvi Needida Spoorthi (1956)
 Hesaragathe (1969)
 Brahamana Huduga (1978)
 Mathu Matha (1984)
 Dehalige Banda Hosa Varsha (1988)
 Saptapadi (1996)
 Home and away – A collection of Kannada short stories.

Awards
 Karnataka Sahitya Academy Award (1985)
 Sahitya Akademi Award (1998)
 Shivaram Karanth Award (1996)
 Rajyotsava Award (1997)

References 

Kannada-language writers
1925 births
Indian male novelists
2005 deaths
Recipients of the Sahitya Akademi Award in Kannada
20th-century Indian novelists
Novelists from Karnataka
People from Mandya district
20th-century Indian male writers